Zindoxifene (INN; former developmental code names D-16726, NSC-341952) is a nonsteroidal selective estrogen receptor modulator (SERM) that was under development in the 1980s and early 1990s for the treatment of breast cancer but was not marketed. It showed estrogenic-like activity in preclinical studies and failed to demonstrate effectiveness as a treatment for breast cancer in clinical trials. Zindoxifene was the lead compound of the distinct 2-phenylindole class of SERMs, and the marketed SERM bazedoxifene was derived from the major active metabolite of zindoxifene, D-15414. Zindoxifene was first described in 1984.

References

External links
 Zindoxifene - AdisInsight

Abandoned drugs
Acetate esters
Hormonal antineoplastic drugs
Indoles
Selective estrogen receptor modulators